William Leahy may refer to:

 William D. Leahy (1875–1959), American naval officer, diplomat, and Chief of Staff to the Commander in Chief from 1942-1949 
 William Harrington Leahy (1904–1986), American naval officer
 William P. Leahy (born 1948), President of Boston College
 William Leahy (priest), Anglican priest in Ireland